is a village located in Kunigami District, Okinawa Prefecture, Japan. The village lies on the island of Iejima.

As of October 2016, the village has an estimated population of 4,192 and the density of 180 persons per km². Ie is in a period of sustained population loss, and has the highest rate of population loss in Okinawa Prefecture. Iejima Airport serves the village. Out of 22.78 km² land of Ie, approximately a third, or 8.02 km² is occupied by Ie Shima Airfield, a training facility, managed by the United States Marine Corps.

Geography

The Village of Ie covers the entirety of Ie Island, and is located to the northwest of Okinawa Island off the Motobu Peninsula. The village is connected to Okinawa via ferry service.

History

The Village of Ie was the site of intense fighting during World War II in the Battle of Okinawa. Ernie Pyle (1900 – 1945), a popular World War II-era American journalist and winner of the 1944 Pulitzer Prize was killed in Ie on April 18, 1945. Pyle was initially buried on the island, but is now interred at the National Memorial Cemetery of the Pacific in Honolulu.

Approximately a half of residents lost their lives during the battle of Ie, and 1,500 villagers who survived the battle were removed to the internment camps in Kerama Islands or an arid strip of Henoko Bay, the northeast area of Okinawa island. Residents of Ie were allowed to return to the island during a two-year period starting in May 1946. Life in the village was hard after World War II; little housing remained on the island, and prewar property boundaries were difficult or impossible to determine. Residents in the immediate post-war period lived in homes made of scavenged materials and relied on American rations for food.

An elementary school was built immediately after the war, and the first village hall was constructed in front of Udunyama. One third of the village remains under U.S. military control.

Transportation

Air
The Village of Ie has a single airport, Iejima Airport, but regular flights to Naha ended in 1977. The runway of the airport were part of the Ie Shima Airfield complex built during World War II. Iejima Airport is primarily used in training exercises by the United States military.

Ferry service
The Village of Ie is connected to Okinawa Island via ferry service. A passenger and car ferry from Port Toguchi in the town of Motobu takes approximately 30 minutes, with regular service consisting of 4 daily departures from Motobu between 9am and 5pm. The village is also connected to the prefectural capital of Naha via a one-hour high-speed ferry from the Port of Tomari.

Education
The municipality has three schools:
 Ie Junior High School (伊江中学校)
 Ie Elementary School (伊江小学校)
 Nishi (West) Elementary School (西小学校)

Notable people
Uechi Kanbun, Founder of Uechi-Ryū.
Shinjō Kiyohide, 9th Dan Okinawan Uechi-Ryū Master, nine-time all-Okinawa Kata and Kumite Champion.
Anly, a Japanese pop musician, was born and raised on the island. She also serves as the tourism ambassador for Ie.

References

External links

 
 Ie official website 

Villages in Okinawa Prefecture